is a Paralympic swimmer from Japan competing mainly in category S12 events.

Yasuharu competed in the 2000 Summer Paralympics as part of the Japanese swimming team.  He was part of the squad that broke the world record in the 4x100 m medley winning the gold medal. Individually he had less success finishing last in his heat of the 200 m medley and 100 m butterfly he also finished last in the final of the 100 m breaststroke and 100 m backstroke.

References

External links
 

Year of birth missing (living people)
Living people
Japanese male backstroke swimmers
Japanese male breaststroke swimmers
Japanese male butterfly swimmers
Japanese male medley swimmers
Paralympic swimmers of Japan
Paralympic gold medalists for Japan
Paralympic medalists in swimming
Swimmers at the 2000 Summer Paralympics
Medalists at the 2000 Summer Paralympics
S12-classified Paralympic swimmers
21st-century Japanese people